Serafima "Sima" Andreyevna Sakhanovich (born 9 February 2000) is a retired Russian figure skater. She has won six medals on the ISU Challenger Series circuit, and is the 2017 C.S. Warsaw Cup champion, and the 2018 C.S. Tallinn Trophy champion. She is also the 2019 Denis Ten Memorial champion.

On the junior level, she is a two-time Junior World silver medalist (2014-2015), a two-time Junior Grand Prix Final silver medalist, the 2013 JGP Estonia champion, the 2014 JGP Japan champion, the 2014 JGP Slovenia champion, and the 2014 Russian junior national champion.

Personal life 
Serafima "Sima" Andreyevna Sakhanovich was born 9 February 2000 in Saint Petersburg. She has two older sisters.

Career

Early career 
Sakhanovich began skating in 2007, coached from the start by Alina Pisarenko in Saint Petersburg.

Sakhanovich finished 12th at the 2012 Russian Junior Championships. At the 2013 Russian Championships, she placed fourth in her senior national debut and then won silver on the junior level behind Elena Radionova.

2013–2014 season: First medal at Junior Worlds 
Sakhanovich made her international debut in the 2013–2014 season. After placing fourth at the ISU Junior Grand Prix in Slovakia, she then won the gold medal in her next JGP event in Estonia. Her results qualified her for the JGP Final in Fukuoka, Japan, where she won the silver medal behind teammate Maria Sotskova. Sakhanovich finished sixth on the senior level at the Russian Championships and went on to win the junior national title ahead of Sotskova. She placed second in both segments at the 2014 World Junior Championships and was awarded the silver medal. Gold went to Elena Radionova and bronze to Evgenia Medvedeva, producing Russia's second consecutive sweep of the World Junior ladies' podium. She experienced pain in her right foot during the event but her condition improved after a month's rest.

Unable to find a sponsor in Saint Petersburg, Sakhanovich decided to relocate to Moscow, where she joined Eteri Tutberidze.

2014–2015 season: Second silver medal at Junior Worlds 
Sakhanovich's first assignment of the 2014 JGP series was in Ljubljana, Slovenia. In the short program, she became the first female skater competing on the junior level to ever surpass the 40-point mark for TES and her overall score was the highest ever achieved in the Junior Grand Prix series by any lady skater. She won the gold medal ahead of Japan's Yuka Nagai. After another gold medal in Japan, she qualified for the 2014–15 JGP Final in Barcelona. In Spain, she won the silver medal behind teammate Evgenia Medvedeva after placing second in both segments.

Competing on the senior level at the 2015 Russian Championships, Sakhanovich placed 11th in the short program but 5th in the free skate, allowing her to move up to 5th overall. At the 2015 Russian Junior Nationals, she placed 4th in the short and second in the free on her way to the bronze medal. She made the team for the 2015 World Junior Championships in Tallinn, Estonia, where she won the silver medal behind Evgenia Medvedeva after placing second in the short and third in the free.

On 9 April 2015, R-Sport news agency reported that Sakhanovich had rejoined her former coach in Saint Petersburg, Alina Pisarenko, and that she hoped to master the quad Salchow in the following season. She said that she had changed coaches because her family was unable to live in two different cities at once.

2015–2016 season: Senior international debut 
Sakhanovich started her season by placing 7th at the 2015 JGP in Spain. She then made a coaching change, moving from Alina Pisarenko to Evgeni Rukavicin, and withdrew from the JGP in Croatia in order to adjust to her new training situation and to change her free program.

Making her senior international debut, Sakahnovich competed at two ISU Challenger Series events; she finished fourth at the 2015 CS Ice Challenge and took silver at the 2015 CS Warsaw Cup with a new season's best score of 176.41 points. Her results at both Russian Championships were the lowest of her career. After placing tenth at the senior event in December, she finished 17th at the junior event in January, having ranked last in the free skate with four falls on her jumps.

2016–2017 season 
Sakhanovich started her season by competing in two ISU Challenger Series events. In mid September she competed at the 2016 CS Nebelhorn Trophy where she placed 6th and in early October she competed at the 2016 CS Finlandia Trophy where she finished 8th.

Making her Grand Prix debut, Sakhanovich placed 7th at the 2016 Skate America. She then competed at the 2016 CS Tallinn Trophy where she won the silver medal behind her teammate Stanislava Konstantinova.

She finished 12th at the 2017 Russian Championships. She was coached by Evgeni Rukavicin in Saint Petersburg.

2017–2018 season 
In late September 2017, Sakhanovich changed coaches, deciding to join Evgeni Plushenko at his skating school in Moscow.

Sakhanovich started her season by winning two ISU Challenger Series medals. In late October she competed at the 2017 CS Minsk-Arena Ice Star where she won the silver medal behind Elizabet Tursynbayeva. She then skated at the 2017 CS Warsaw Cup where she won the gold medal.

She placed fifth at her Grand Prix assignment, 2017 Skate America, and ninth at the 2018 Russian Championships. In addition to Plushenko, she trained under Yulia Lavrenchuk until Lavrenchuk's departure at the end of the season. After returning to Saint Petersburg, Sakhanovich decided to be coached by Angelina Turenko.

2018–2019 season 
In mid-November, Sakhanovich skated at the 2018 CS Alpen Trophy, winning the silver medal behind her teammate Anna Tarusina. Two weeks later she competed at the 2018 CS Tallinn Trophy where she won the gold medal with a personal best score of 202.62 points.  She did not compete at the 2019 Russian Championships, but later placed fifth at the Bavarian Open.

2019–2020 season 
Sakhanovich began the season at the inaugural Denis Ten Memorial Challenge in Almaty, winning the event.  She received her first Grand Prix assignment in two years, the 2019 Skate Canada International, where she placed eighth.  She placed twelfth at the 2020 Russian Championships.

Programs

Competitive highlights 
GP: Grand Prix; CS: Challenger Series; JGP: Junior Grand Prix

Detailed results

Senior career

Junior career

References

External links 

 
 

2000 births
Russian female single skaters
World Junior Figure Skating Championships medalists
Living people
Figure skaters from Saint Petersburg